Rachael Ostovich (born February 25, 1991) is an American mixed martial artist who competes in the Flyweight division. A professional since 2017, she has competed in the UFC and Invicta Fighting Championships. Since her release from the UFC, she has not signed with any other MMA promotion, but did fight in an event for Bare Knuckle Fighting Championship in 2021.

Mixed martial arts career

Early career
Ostovich began her amateur MMA career in 2010. Over the next three years, she amassed an undefeated amateur MMA record of 6–0.

Ostovich made her professional MMA debut in January 2014 in her native Hawaii. She went 1–1 before joining Invicta Fighting Championships

Invicta FC
Ostovich debuted for the all-female Invicta Fighting Championships in December 2014. She faced Evva Johnson at Invicta FC 10 and won the fight by split decision.

In her second bout for the promotion, Ostovich faced Andrea Lee on September 12, 2015, at Invicta FC 14. She lost the bout via verbal submission to an armbar in the third round.

In her third bout for the promotion, Ostovich faced Ariel Beck on May 7, 2016, at Invicta FC 17. She won the bout via a split decision.

In her fourth fight for the promotion, Ostovich faced Christine Ferea on January 14, 2017, at Invicta FC 21. She lost the fight via TKO in the third round, bringing her Invicta FC record to 2–2 before joining The Ultimate Fighter.

The Ultimate Fighter
In August 2017, it was announced that Ostovich would be one of the fighters featured on The Ultimate Fighter 26, where the process to crown the UFC's inaugural 125-pound women's champion will take place. In the opening round, Ostovich defeated Melinda Fábián by rear-naked choke submission. In the quarterfinals, she faced Barb Honchak and lost the bout via unanimous decision.

Ultimate Fighting Championship
Ostovich faced Karine Gevorgyan on December 1, 2017, at The Ultimate Fighter 26 Finale. She won the fight via armbar submission in the first round.

Ostovich faced Montana De La Rosa on July 6, 2018, at The Ultimate Fighter 27 Finale. She lost the fight via rear-naked choke in round three.

Ostovich was scheduled to face Paige VanZant on January 19, 2019, at UFC on ESPN+ 1. It was reported on November 18, 2018, that Ostovich was violently assaulted, sustaining a broken orbital bone and other injuries, and due to the injuries she sustained, she pulled out from the fight against VanZant. On November 27, the bout between Ostovich and VanZant was confirmed to push through on January 19, 2019, after Ostovich was cleared to fight by her doctor. Ostovich lost the fight by submission via armbar in the second round.

Ostovich was scheduled to face Veronica Macedo on August 10, 2019, at UFC on ESPN+ 14, but Ostovich was replaced by Polyana Viana for unknown reasons.

Ostovich was scheduled to face Shana Dobson at UFC Fight Night 168 in Auckland, New Zealand on February 23, 2020, at UFC Fight Night 168. However, Ostovich was removed from the bout due to testing positive for ostarine, and she was replaced by Priscila Cachoeira. On June 18, it was announced that Ostovich had accepted a USADA suspension for one year due to testing positive for ostarine, retroactive to January 3, 2020.

Ostovich tested positive for Ostarine and GW1516 on January 3, 2020, and she was suspended by USADA for eight months. The prohibited substance was found in one of her supplements and was not listed on the supplement label.

Ostovich faced Gina Mazany on November 28, 2020, at UFC on ESPN: Blaydes vs. Lewis. She lost the fight via third round TKO from body kicks.

After 3 straight losses, Ostovich was released by the UFC on December 7, 2020.

Bare-knuckle boxing
On April 27, 2021, Ostovich and Bare Knuckle Fighting Championship both announced that she had signed with the organization and is expected to make her debut in July. On May 27, 2021, it was announced that Ostovich is scheduled to face Paige VanZant – whom she lost to in mixed martial arts at UFC Fight Night: Cejudo vs. Dillashaw – at BKFC 19 on July 23, 2021. She won the bout via unanimous decision.

Personal life

Domestic violence
On November 18, 2018, Ostovich was assaulted in her hometown of Honolulu, leaving her with a broken orbital bone. The perpetrator is alleged to be her husband, Arnold Berdon, who is also an MMA fighter. Ostovich filed and was granted a temporary restraining order against her husband effective until May 19, 2019. Berdon was arrested on November 20, 2018, for second-degree assault (felony) and he was released on a bond of $75,000. The case is under investigation currently by the Honolulu Police Department. A nine-minute video taken by a witness and obtained by Hawaii News Now captures Berdon repeatedly saying "I’m going to murder you. I’m going to fucking murder you," and Ostovich’s cries for help. On December 20, 2018, Berdon plead not guilty in connection with the case. The trial's next hearing was in March 2019, where Berdon pleaded no contest on the case.

The sentencing took place on May 16, 2019, in a Honolulu court and Berdon was sentenced to four-year probation in a domestic assault. Ostovich's divorce decree was filed with full custody of their six-year-old daughter.

Mixed martial arts record

|-
|Loss
|align=center|4–6
|Gina Mazany
|TKO (body kick)
|UFC on ESPN: Smith vs. Clark
|
|align=center|3
|align=center|4:10
|Las Vegas, Nevada, United States
|
|-
|Loss
|align=center| 4–5
|Paige VanZant
|Submission (armbar)
|UFC Fight Night: Cejudo vs. Dillashaw
|
|align=center|2
|align=center|1:50
|Brooklyn, New York, United States
|
|-
|Loss
|align=center| 4–4
|Montana De La Rosa 
|Submission (rear-naked choke)
|The Ultimate Fighter: Undefeated Finale
|
|align=center|3
|align=center|4:21
|Las Vegas, Nevada, United States
|
|-
|Win
|align=center | 4–3
|Karine Gevorgyan
|Submission (armbar)
|The Ultimate Fighter: A New World Champion Finale
|
|align=center|1
|align=center|1:40
|Las Vegas, Nevada, United States
|
|-
| Loss
| align=center | 3–3
| Christine Ferea
| TKO (punches)
| Invicta FC 21: Anderson vs. Tweet
| 
| align=center | 3
| align=center | 1:29
| Kansas City, Missouri, United States
|
|-
| Win
| align=center | 3–2
| Ariel Beck
| Decision (split)
| Invicta FC 17: Evinger vs. Schneider
| 
| align=center | 3
| align=center | 5:00
| Costa Mesa, California, United States
| Fight of the Night.
|-
| Loss
| align=center | 2–2
| Andrea Lee
| Submission (armbar)
| Invicta FC 14: Evinger vs. Kianzad
| 
| align=center | 3
| align=center | 4:58
| Kansas City, Missouri, United States
|
|-
| Win
| align=center | 2–1
| Evva Johnson
| Decision (split)
| Invicta FC 10: Waterson vs. Tiburcio
| 
| align=center | 3
| align=center | 5:00
| Houston, Texas, United States
|
|-
| Win
| align=center | 1–1
| Misha Nassiri
| Submission (armbar)
| X-1: Jara vs. Vitale
| 
| align=center | 3
| align=center | N/A
| Honolulu, Hawaii, United States
|
|-
| Loss
| align=center | 0–1
| Jenny Liou Shriver
| TKO (knee to the body and punches)
| Destiny MMA Na Koa 4
| 
| align=center | 2
| align=center | N/A
| Honolulu, Hawaii, United States
|
|-

|-
| Loss
| align=center | 1–1
| Barb Honchak
| Decision (unanimous)
|rowspan=2| The Ultimate Fighter: A New World Champion
|  (air date)
| align=Center | 2
| align=center | 5:00
|rowspan=2| Las Vegas, Nevada, United States
| 
|-
| Win
| align=center | 1–0
| Melinda Fábián
| Submission (rear-naked choke)
|  (air date)
| align=center | 1
| align=center | 4:22
|

Bare knuckle boxing record

|-
|Win
|align=center|1–0
|Paige VanZant
|Decision (unanimous)
|BKFC 19
|
|align=center|5
|align=center|2:00
|Tampa, Florida, United States

References

External links
 
 

1991 births
Mixed martial artists from Hawaii
American female mixed martial artists
Living people
American female judoka
Flyweight mixed martial artists
Mixed martial artists utilizing judo
American women boxers
Bare-knuckle boxers
American practitioners of Brazilian jiu-jitsu
Female Brazilian jiu-jitsu practitioners
Ultimate Fighting Championship female fighters
21st-century American women